Tender Is the Night is the fifth studio album by Canadian musician Old Man Luedecke. It was released in November 2012 under True North Records.

Track listing

Personnel
 Mike Bub - bass
 Kenny Malone - percussion 
 Tim O’Brien - mandolin, fiddle, vocals, bouzouki, guitar
 Chris Luedecke - vocals, banjo, guitar

References

2012 albums
True North Records albums
Old Man Luedecke albums